Strathroy station is a railway station in Strathroy-Caradoc, Ontario, Canada. It is a stop on Via Rail's Toronto–Sarnia train route. The station is wheelchair accessible. It has an enclosed, unheated shelter and used to be opened 1 hour before and 1 hour after trains. The station is rarely opened now due to high levels of vandalism. Two trains service Strathroy daily, VIA 84 (eastbound) at 09:27 and VIA 87 (westbound) at 21:37. Reservations are required 40 minutes in advance in order for a train to stop at this station.

The International Limited was operated jointly by Via Rail and Amtrak between Chicago and Toronto. The service, which had started in 1982, was discontinued in 2004.

See also

 Quebec City–Windsor Corridor (Via Rail) – trans-provincial passenger rail corridor which includes Strathroy
 Rail transport in Ontario

References

External links

 Strathroy train station on VIARail.ca

Transport in Strathroy-Caradoc
Via Rail stations in Ontario
Railway stations in Canada opened in 2004
Former Amtrak stations in Canada
Railway stations in Middlesex County, Ontario